Dashnor Kastrioti (born 30 November 1974) is an Albanian former footballer.

International career
Kastrioti played his first and only game for Albania in an April 1996 friendly match against Bosnia and Hercegovina. It proved to be his only international game.

References

External links
 
 

1974 births
Living people
Association football forwards
Albanian footballers
Albanian expatriate footballers
Albanian expatriate sportspeople in Germany
Expatriate footballers in Germany
Albania international footballers